Crassula arborescens, the silver jade plant, silver dollar plant, beestebul, Chinese jade, money plant, or money tree, is a species of succulent plant in the family Crassulaceae. It is an endemic plant of the Western Cape,  South Africa. It is a  succulent shrub. It has round gray "Silver Dollar" leaves. It blooms in summer, with white to pink flowers. It is cultivated as an ornamental plant for use in drought tolerant and succulent gardens, and in container gardens. It is also suitable for growing indoors as a houseplant.

Gallery

References

arborescens
Flora of the Cape Provinces
Endemic flora of South Africa
Garden plants of Africa
Drought-tolerant plants
House plants